Mordella detracta is a species of beetle in the genus Mordella of the family Mordellidae, which is part of the superfamily Tenebrionoidea. It was discovered in 1876.

References

Beetles described in 1876
detracta
Taxa named by Francis Polkinghorne Pascoe